Dodge House may refer to:

in the United States
(by state, then city)
Walter L. Dodge House, West Hollywood, California, formerly listed on the National Register of Historic Places (NRHP)
Dodge House (Mishawaka, Indiana), NRHP-listed in St. Joseph County
Augustus Caesar Dodge House, Burlington, Iowa, listed on the NRHP in Des Moines County  
Grenville M. Dodge House, Council Bluffs, Iowa, a U.S. National Historic Landmark
Edward Dodge House (Cambridge, Massachusetts), NRHP-listed
Paine-Dodge House, Ipswich, Massachusetts, NRHP-listed
Newman-Fiske-Dodge House, Wenham, Massachusetts, NRHP-listed
Helen Dodge Three-Decker, Worcester, Massachusetts, NRHP-listed 
Dodge Mansion (Grosse Point Farms, Michigan), NRHP-listed
Dodge Mansion (Lansing, Michigan), also known as Turner-Dodge House, NRHP-listed
Dodge-Bailey House, Santa Fe, New Mexico, listed on the NRHP in Santa Fe County 
Mabel Dodge Luhan House, Taos, New Mexico, a U.S. National Historic Landmark
William E. Dodge House, Bronx, New York City, NRHP-listed
Lillian Sefton Dodge Estate, Mill Neck, New York, NRHP-listed
Dodge-Greenleaf House, Otisville, New York, NRHP-listed
Thomas Dodge Homestead, Port Washington, New York, NRHP-listed
Christopher Dodge House, Providence, Rhode Island, a historic house and hotel
Edward Dodge House (Port Washington, Wisconsin), NRHP-listed in Ozaukee County

See also
Edward Dodge House (disambiguation)
Dodge Mansion (disambiguation)